Kirsty Elizabeth Flavell (born 20 November 1967) is a New Zealand former cricketer who played as a right-handed batter and right-arm medium bowler. She appeared in 6 Test matches and 38 One Day Internationals for New Zealand between 1988 and 1996. She played domestic cricket for Southern Districts and Canterbury.

She was the first woman to score a double century in a women's Test match, scoring 204 against England in 1996. Flavell has previously been a member of the New Zealand team's selection panel.

References

External links

1967 births
Living people
Cricketers from Christchurch
New Zealand women cricketers
New Zealand women Test cricketers
New Zealand women One Day International cricketers
Southern Districts women cricketers
Canterbury Magicians cricketers